, also known as D-Fragments, is a comedic manga series by Tomoya Haruno that began serialization in Media Factory's Monthly Comic Alive in July 2008. It has been collected in sixteen tankōbon volumes as of October 2021. A 12-episode anime television series adaptation by Brain's Base aired from January 6 to March 24, 2014.

Plot
The story focuses on a semi-connected series of sketches as delinquent student Kenji Kazama is forced into joining his school's struggling "Game Creation Club" (Game Development Club in the Seven Seas translation) by its members, a quartet of crazy women with their own eccentricities that drive him crazy. As he attempts to distance himself from the club, the more he seems to run into not only his fellow club members, but others from his school who drive him insane to different degrees.

Characters
Most main characters' names are reference to railway stations in Tokyo, particularly Keiō Line. Some main character's first names, like Takao's and Funabori's, are not yet revealed.

Main characters

The leader of the "Kazama Party" and one of the head delinquents in school, he was forcibly recruited into the club after attempting to help them put out a fire. He is actually quite capable of fighting, however because he can never hit a girl he "supposedly" is still no match for the other girls in the club. While not being able to hit a girl, he later starts using trickery and deception to outmatch them in competitions. Later, the club members refer him as "Wind" elemental, due to his name. At all times, he serves as the tsukkomi (comedic straight man) to the antics around him.

The President of the Game Creation Club (Provisional). She has blonde hair. Her element is "Fire", although she later states that her true element is actually "Darkness". Her main combat method is putting a bag over her opponents' head, rendering them blind, hence the darkness element. She carries a lot of spare bags so she can use them anytime. Despite having a small profile, she is referred as "Strongest Darkness" and is the strongest in school. She refers to Kenji as her "important person", and shows jealousy when other girls approach him.

A second-year and the President of the student council. Her authority is so great even the teachers fear her. Her element is "Earth", and her main combat method includes punching her opponent, throwing dirt at them, or digging traps. She also has a habit of burying her victims up to the neck.

A first-year and a pink-haired tomboy. Her element is "Water", and is usually seen carrying a water bottle. Her combat method includes pouring water on her hands, or forcing water down an opponent's throat. She later starts referring to Kenji and Noe as her siblings, though both of them deny any relation.

The faculty advisor of the club. Her element is "Lightning" because she carries around a taser. She is shown to be sleeping almost anytime, even in her own class. She also seems to have a fairly poor memory as shown when she cannot remember the name of a past student who lent her the track suit that she wears at all times.

President of the "real" Game Creation Club with no known first name. Friends with Roka, even though she left and started her own Game Creation Club on negative terms. She has a crush on Kazama. After losing a match with Game Creation Club (Provisional), she actually starts to hang around with the club more often than her own club.

Secondary characters

Real Game Creation Club
 

A glasses-wearing girl with a perverted streak who often dresses up Oka in girly outfits. She acts as Chitose's counterpart for the "real" Game Creation Club.

 

A boy with a very feminine appearance. Due to a misunderstanding during their first met, Kenji refers to him as a girl, which he never had a chance to correct.

 

A big, muscular club member. He is described as looking like a brutish giant on the outside, but in reality he is a timid pacifist.

Kazama Gang
 

Student council Vice-President with a masochistic streak who both admires and fears Chitose.

 

A short but fat student who is a member of Kazama Gang. Despite his delinquent status, he is very intelligent, scoring second in the school placement test.

 

Tall member of the Kazama Gang.

Former student council

A junior student, Tama is the ex-Student Council President before Chitose. She has a grudge with Chitose since their childhood and secretly plots to have Game Creation Club (Provisional) disbanded. She specializes in using her twin-tails hairstyle in combat, in which she is renowned as the strongest in Fujou High, capable of fending off Roka, and known as "The Legendary" in other schools. She seems to have an interest in Kenji after losing to him during the competition between ex-student council members and Game Creation Club (Provisional), and starts to participate in the club activities despite not being a club member.

 

Ex-student council Vice President. Otaku.

Ex-student council treasurer, courteous but also quite capable of fighting.

Ex-student council secretary. She has an unstable stomach and often vomits to the point that friends and enemies alike call her "Barfie". She is often shown working many different types of part-time jobs and often runs into the club activities.

Others

The club's other male member, he has an unrequited crush on Roka. He often uses the gap between a bookshelf and the wall as his "seat". Other club members refer to him as a "Light" elemental due to the sparkles that seem to surround his appearance. Roka is quite harsh toward him, while most other club members simply ignore him. He later joined the Kazama Gang.

 

Kenji's classmate, she is good at housework and often shown doing various chores for the class. Has trouble being the center of attention, and is often blushing when she receives praise from anyone. She has a crush on Kenji.

 

Kenji's little sister who shares her brother's spiky hair and a penchant for being the comedic "straight man" in a world full of crazy punchlines. She is often comforted by Kenji when she can't take the insanity of his daily life. Called an "ice" elemental by members of the Game Creation Club due to her love of ice cream, and has also been referred to as the "little sister" element.

 

A man who dresses in a tokusatsu outfit and plays a superhero.

 

Kenji's English Literature teacher. He saved the Kazama Gang (and RaGaiGar) from a flaming building when they were kids. He inspired Kenji to help those who are in need. A parody of real-life actor Sean Connery with elements of Indiana Jones, and supposedly wields the "Dandy" element.

 
Roka's sister who attends another high school, having worse grades. Has made elaborate lunchboxes for Roka and seeks to "protect" her from Kenji.

 
A third-year student at Fujou High who has a scary, smiling expression on her face all the time. Despite this, she is actually known throughout the school as a dependable person, and even offers her guidance to Kenji on occasion. She is nicknamed .

Media

Manga
Written and illustrated by Tomoya Haruno, the manga began serialization in Media Factory's Monthly Comic Alive in July 2008. The chapters are being collected and released in the tankōbon format by Media Factory. As of October 21, 2021, sixteen volumes were released. Seven Seas Entertainment has licensed the manga.

Anime
An anime television series adaptation by Brain's Base aired from January 6 to March 24, 2014 on TV Tokyo. The series is directed by Seiki Sugawara, Makoto Uezu is in charge of series composition, while Nijine composed the music. Funimation has licensed the series.

References

External links
 at Media Factory 
 

Anime series based on manga
Brain's Base
Funimation
Harem anime and manga
Kadokawa Dwango franchises
Media Factory manga
Romantic comedy anime and manga
School life in anime and manga
Seinen manga
Seven Seas Entertainment titles
Television shows written by Makoto Uezu
TV Tokyo original programming